fuse* is a multidisciplinary art studio based in Modena, Italy. fuse*’s main focus is the realisation of artistic experiences harnessing digital technologies. By mixing these two universes, the studio wants to inspire and positively impact local and international communities by suggesting novel ways to see and interpret reality.

History 

fuse* was founded in 2007 by Luca Camellini and Mattia Carretti. in Campogalliano, a small town north of Modena, Italy. Friends since childhood, after graduating they started mixing their different skills and interests to technically support external organisations and companies - Luca has graduated in Computer Engineering from the University of Modena and Reggio Emilia and has always pursued his passion for computer programming and graphical simulations, while Mattia graduated in Chemistry and later in Business Administration from the Polytechnic University of Milan. Their passion for digital arts, technology and science brought them to merge the three through immersive art installation and artworks. Sound design has always been one of the main pillars of the studio, and in 2009 sound designer Riccardo Bazzoni also joined fuse*.
Snow Fall has been the first artistic project realised in 2009 in Modena, consisting of an interactive installation processing the images it captured by video cameras in real time. This first version was realised with infrared cameras while the successive iterations of the work, exhibited in Manchester, UK (2015) and Washington DC, US (2019), employed new and more modern hardware and software.

In 2011, the studio started experimenting with live performances based on the real-time interaction between sound, movement and light: N 4.0 was first presented in 2011 on the occasion of the art competition ‘Celeste Prize’ in New York. On the same line, fuse* started developing in 2014 the trilogy composed by Ljòs (Light in Icelandic), Dökk (Darkness) and Sál (Soul). Ljòs and Dökk are currently on tour and have been presented at international festivals such as Mutek - Montreal (CA), Kikk - Namur (BE), Digilogue - Istanbul (TR) and RomaEuropa -  Rome (IT). Sál, the third chapter, is still in production.

Over the years, the studio has developed more and more immersive artistic experiences that travelled all around the world and have been exhibited, between others, in Prague (CZ), Beijing (CN), Milan (IT), Barcelona (ES), Helsinki (FI) and Atlanta (US).

More recently, the studio has developed some new series of works: first of all Multiverse, which premiered in 2017 in Parma (IT) with a monumental installation comprising a vertical projection and two mirroring surfaces 7.5m high. The work builds on the multiverse theory of Lee Smolin and won awards such as the Art and Science Innovation Award from Tsinghua University and the National Museum of China.In 2020, the studio started diving into the concept of trust and developed Treu, presented at the Pochen Biennale of 2020. The concept has been further developed for the studio’s second solo show at Artechouse NYC, titled Trust (2022): exploring the theme from different timelines, the immersive installation also includes a sentiment analysis of 750,000 tweets containing the word “trust” uploaded during the pandemic.

That same year, the studio released Artificial Botany, an ongoing project exploring botanical illustrations through machine learning algorithms: premiered at Cosmo Caixa in Barcelona (ES), it has later been adapted for shows in Venice (IT) and Utrecht (NL). In particular, the project has also been adapted for the spaces of Unipol CUBO (Bologna, IT) thanks to additional illustrated herbarium by Ulisse Aldrovandi provided by BUB (University Library of Bologna), the Botanical Garden of Bologna and Alma Mater Studiorum

In 2022, fuse* also realised Luna Somnium, a site-specific installation for the Gasometro in Rome. The studio also collaborated with Nederlands Kamerkoor and realised the visuals of the live media performance Van Gogh in Me from paintings of Vincent van Gogh and Gustav Klimt: it premiered in the Konzerthaus in Vienna and at the Koninklijk Theater Carré in Amsterdam

Since 2016, fuse* has been actively involved in the organisation of NODE, an international festival for digital arts and live-media held in Modena.

Works 

 Sál, 2024
 Luna Somnium, 2022
 Trust, 2022
 Van Gogh in Me, 2022
 Fragile, 2022
 Multiverse.dome, 2021
 Treu, 2020
 Falin Mynd, 2020
 Mimesis, 2020
 Artificial Botany, 2020
 Everything in Existence, 2019
 Multiverse, 2018
 Dökk, 2017
 Amygdala, 2016
 Clepsydra, 2016
 Ljós, 2014
 N 4.0, 2011
 Snow Fall, 2009

Selected exhibitions and shows

References 

Culture in Modena
Italian artist groups and collectives
New media artists